Sarajevo Bypass is part of European route E73, and it connects the A1 with Sarajevska Cesta and Sarajevo International Airport.There would be 2 interchanges. One is located in XII Transversal, and other one is located on A1, and these two interchanges will be connected with exit road from A1.

Exit list 

{| class="wikitable"
|- 
!scope="col"|km
!scope="col"|Exit
!scope="col"|Name
!scope="col"|Destination
!scope="col"|Notes
|-
| 0.0
| align=center |1
| Sarajevo-north 
| 
| Connection to Tuzla and Sarajevo-north
|-
| 5.8
| balign=center |2
| Butila
| 
| Connection to Sarajevo and Višegrad; operating since 2015
|-
| 8.8
| align=center |3
| Sarajevo-west
|
| Connection to Sarajevo-west and Sarajevo-Ilidža

Highways in Bosnia and Herzegovina
Transport in Sarajevo